Phyllodesmium koehleri is a species of sea slug, an aeolid nudibranch, a marine gastropod mollusc in the family Facelinidae.

Distribution 
Known from southern Queensland, Australia; Okinawa, Japan; Sulawesi, Indonesia, New Britain, Papua New Guinea and the Philippines.

References

Facelinidae
Gastropods described in 2008